Víctor Mendoza (born 24 August 1963) is an Ecuadorian footballer. He played in four matches for the Ecuador national football team from 1989 to 1993. He was also part of Ecuador's squad for the 1989 Copa América tournament.

References

External links
 

1963 births
Living people
Ecuadorian footballers
Ecuador international footballers
Place of birth missing (living people)
Association football goalkeepers
L.D.U. Portoviejo footballers
Barcelona S.C. footballers
S.D. Aucas footballers